Emile Louis Boulpaep (born 15 September 1938) is a Belgian physiologist and since 1977 President of the Belgian American Educational Foundation. He is a member of the board of the Francqui Foundation.

Education
He studied medicine at the Katholieke Universiteit Leuven (Leuven, Belgium), where he received a medical degree in 1962. In 1987 he obtained an honorary M.A. from Yale University in New Haven, Connecticut.

Career
Emile Boulpaep is Professor and Director of Medical & Graduate Studies in Cellular & Molecular Physiology at Yale University. His research focuses on kidney tubule cells and cellular physiology.

In collaboration with Walter Boron, Boulpaep has written and published a textbook on medical physiology.

References 

Belgian physiologists
KU Leuven alumni
Living people
1938 births